Jumla may refer to:

Mir Jumla II (1591–1663), subahdar of Bengal
Jumla District, one of the seventy-seven districts of Nepal
Jumla (town), seat of Jumla District
Jumla Airport, the airport in the town of Jumla
Jamla, a village in southern Syria near Golan Heights

See also
Joomla